The Ravillou is a 13 km long river in the Dordogne department, France. It is a right tributary of the Loue, part of the Dordogne basin. The river rises in the commune of Dussac and runs through Saint-Germain-des-Prés before emptying into the Loue northwest of Coulaures. 

On the night of June 13 and 14, 2007, a flash flood caused by a storm turned the Ravillou and its tributary the Merdanson into devastating torrents, that damaged the town of Saint-Germain-des-Prés and the bridge across the Ravillou.

References

Rivers of France
Rivers of Nouvelle-Aquitaine
Rivers of Dordogne